Loranne Vella (born 10 July 1972) is a writer, translator and performer in Malta.

Biography  
Loranne Vella was born in Victoria, Gozo, Malta to Mary Grace Monseigneur nee Ellul. She was raised by adoptive parents Teodosia Floria Vella nee Farrugia (1937-2010) and Joseph Vella (1926-2012).

She started her professional career as an English and Drama teacher at St. Aloysius College, B'Kara (1995-2005).

Education 
She attended the following institutions for her Education: Thi Lakin School, Attard (1975-1976), St. Joseph School, B'Bajda (1976-77), St. Joseph School, Paola (1977-1984), Sandhurst School (later known as Sir Adrian Dingli School), Pembroke (Sept-Dec1984), Maria ReginaJunior Lyceum, B'Bajda (1984-88), Ġan Franġisk Abela Sixth Form, Msida (1988-1989), University of Malta, tal-Qroqq - 1989-90 , Foundation Course 1990-1991, B.Comm (incomplete) 1991-1995, B.A. Hons in Theatre Studies (Mediterranean Institute) and English as secondary subject 1995-2000, M.A. in Theatre Studies.

Personal life 

Married to: Simon Bartolo (1996-2011).

Works and Collaborations 
Artistic Career - Co-founded Aleateia Group Theatre in 1992 with Simon Bartolo, Victor Debono and Russell Muscat, and trained and performed at the Valletta Campus Theatre (then known as MITP Theatre - Mediterranean Institute Theatre Programme) till 2005.The group was formed while all  were University Students finding the need to put into practice the various theories and disciplines encountered in their studies as well as discover their own methodology of work and discipline.
In 2013 she collaborated with photographer Ritty Tacsum in her 4 Rooms exhibition.

This was the first time Vella combined literature, photography and performance in one event, an exercise which was repeated in the subsequent book launches (Rokit - 2017, Mill-bieb 'il ġewwa - 2019). It is also the fundamental principal behind the performance art collective which she co-founded with Sephora Gauci in 2017, Barumbara Collective  - to create performative events in collaboration with artists from other art forms.

Between 2014-2017 she translated several children's stories from French into Maltese (known as Rumanzini) and one from Spanish into Maltese. 

Between 2012-2017 she wrote Rokit. The title is mostly referring to the image of the rocket ready for launching which haunted her during the entire five years of writing

In 2019 she collaborated with artist Trevor Borg and wrote a story for children inspired by his work presented at the Venice Biennale as part of the Maltese Pavilion. The title of the story is Smajna Isimna Taħt l-Art, published in November 2019.

References 
 

1972 births
People from Victoria, Gozo
Living people
21st-century Maltese writers
21st-century Maltese women writers
Maltese translators
French–Maltese translators
Spanish–Maltese translators